Ja'Marcus Ingram (born September 2, 1997) is an American football cornerback for the Buffalo Bills of the National Football League (NFL). He played college football at Buffalo. He signed with the Bills as an undrafted free agent on May 16, 2022.

Professional career
Ingram signed with the Buffalo Bills as an undrafted free agent on May 16, 2022. He was waived by on August 30, 2022, and signed to the practice squad the next day. He was promoted to the active roster on October 8, 2022. He was waived on October 10 and re-signed to the practice squad. He signed a reserve/future contract on January 23, 2023.

References

External links

1997 births
Living people
American football cornerbacks
Buffalo Bulls football players
Buffalo Bills players
Utah State Aggies football players
Texas Tech Red Raiders football players